Francis Constantine Ward (12 February 1891 – 15 December 1966) was an Irish Fianna Fáil politician and medical doctor.

Early life
He was born in County Monaghan on 12 February 1891 in Corlygorm, Donaghmoyne, County Monaghan, son of Patrick Ward, a farmer, and Elizabeth Ruddin. He was educated at the Patrician Brothers' schools, Carrickmacross, and studied medicine at University College Dublin (UCD). While a student at UCD he was a founder-member of the Irish Volunteers at the Dublin Rotunda meeting on 25 November 1913. He qualified as a doctor in 1914, and was medical officer in Scotstown, County Monaghan from 1915 to 1919, and Dundalk, County Louth from 1919 to 1920. He was selected to contest the 1918 general election for Sinn Féin in Monaghan North, but stood aside in favour of Ernest Blythe, who won the seat.

Revolutionary period
He fought with the Irish Republican Army (IRA) in his native county in the Irish War of Independence and on the Republican side in the Irish Civil War, having opposed the Anglo-Irish Treaty. A senior officer in the IRA, by the July 1921 truce he held the rank of colonel-commandant.

Politics
He was a founder member of Fianna Fáil. He was an unsuccessful candidate at the June 1927 general election, but was first elected to Dáil Éireann at the September 1927 general election for the Monaghan constituency and was re-elected at each subsequent general election until his retirement in 1948. After Fianna Fáil's victory at the 1932 general election he was appointed Parliamentary Secretary to the Minister for Local Government and Public Health. He retained this junior ministerial rank through the 1930s and into the 1940s.

Parliamentary Secretary for Public Health
He served under successive ministers Seán T. O'Kelly and Seán MacEntee, and was delegated ever-increasing responsibility for health and public assistance. During the 1930s he concentrated resources on overhaul and extension of the hospital system. He utilised funds made available to the department from the hospitals sweepstakes, he authorised construction of twenty-four county and district hospitals and fourteen specialist hospitals. He established an advisory hospitals commission and unified friendly societies into a single national health insurance society. During this time he was effectively the Minister for Health. Frequently consulting with catholic church authorities (notably Dublin archbishop John Charles McQuaid) over medical matters, at whose behest he banned sale of the newly marketed sanitary tampons in 1944, out of concerns regarding the sexual arousal of girls at an impressionable age.

That same year he earned controversy for the government. He was poised to become the state's first health minister in view of announced government intentions to establish a separate Department of Health, but Ward fell victim to the state's first political scandal involving allegations of personal impropriety. He owned a bacon factory business in Monaghan. After the manager was dismissed, the manager's brother Patrick MacCarvill, a former Teachta Dála (TD) for Monaghan, and a close friend of Taoiseach Éamon de Valera, sent a list of allegations about Ward to de Valera. An inquiry was set up and the Tribunal reported a month later. Ward was cleared of all charges except tax evasion on payments he received from the business. De Valera insisted he resign and he did so a week later. Ward was embittered at the failure of Fianna Fáil colleagues to rally to his support and never again attended  Leinster House and did not contest the 1948 general election (in which MacCarvill stood unsuccessfully in Monaghan for Clann na Poblachta). The Ward scandal contributed to the undermining of public confidence in the Fianna Fáil government and its 1948 electoral defeat. The substance of the 1945 health bill, purged of its more draconian features, was incorporated into the 1947 public health act, the basis of the 1951 Mother and Child Scheme crisis when minister Noël Browne sought to implement its relevant provisions.

After politics
He retired from politics at the 1948 general election, and resumed his medical practice. He died in Dublin, on 15 December 1966, survived by his wife Sheila, four sons and two daughters.

References

1891 births
1966 deaths
Fianna Fáil TDs
People of the Irish Civil War (Anti-Treaty side)
Members of the 6th Dáil
Members of the 7th Dáil
Members of the 8th Dáil
Members of the 9th Dáil
Members of the 10th Dáil
Members of the 11th Dáil
Members of the 12th Dáil
Politicians from County Monaghan
20th-century Irish medical doctors
Parliamentary Secretaries of the 12th Dáil
Parliamentary Secretaries of the 11th Dáil
Parliamentary Secretaries of the 10th Dáil
Parliamentary Secretaries of the 9th Dáil
Parliamentary Secretaries of the 8th Dáil
Parliamentary Secretaries of the 7th Dáil